Smyrna Elementary School is a historic elementary school building located at Smyrna in Chenango County, New York. The original , "L" shaped school was constructed in 1941.  In 1956, a  addition was completed in two sections; a classroom section to the east and small kitchen addition to the south.  It is a single story building with basement and mezzanine work space.  The building is in the Art Moderne style.  The school closed in the late 1970s after consolidation in the Sherburne-Earlville Central School.

It was added to the National Register of Historic Places in 1996.

References

School buildings on the National Register of Historic Places in New York (state)
School buildings completed in 1941
Buildings and structures in Chenango County, New York
National Register of Historic Places in Chenango County, New York